Veljekset Keskinen (Keskinen Brothers) is a department store in Tuuri, Alavus, Finland.

It receives over 6 million customers per year, and is the largest department store in Finland.
The store is a tourist attraction as well as a regular department store.

There is a large horse shoe at the parking area, as the name of the village ("Tuuri") means "luck" in Finnish; it stands at number three in Reuters' list of world's ugliest buildings and monuments.

References

External links
 The official website of Veljekset Keskinen

Department stores of Finland
Töysä
Buildings and structures in South Ostrobothnia
Tourist attractions in South Ostrobothnia